The following is a list of Filipino (Pinoy) superheroes, who have either appeared in Filipino comic books (komiks), television shows (fantaserye), or movies.


A
A-Gel from Batang X
Abdullah from "Kuwtmak"
Adarna from Sandugo
Afnan from "Kuwtmak" 
Aguiluz from Mulawin
Agimat from Agimat, Ang Anting-anting ni Lolo and Si Agimat at si Enteng Kabisote and Si Agimat, si Enteg Kabisote at si Ako
Alakdan from Bayan Knights
Alamid from Sandugo
Alamid from the 1998 movie Alamid: Ang Alamat
Alena from Encantadia and Etheria
Alexandra Trese from Trese by Budjette Tan (writer) and Kajo Baldisimo (artist)
Almiro, Prince from The Last Prince
Alvera, Diwani from Enchanted Garden
Alwina from Mulawin
Alyas Aswang
Alyas Hunyango
Alyas Robin Hood
Alyssa from "Kuwtmak"
Aman Sinaya of the Diwatas (Philippine goddess of the sea; Marvel Comics' Thor & Hercules: Encyclopædia Mythologica)
Amanikable, god of sea and hunt in Philippine mythology (Aquaman)
Amazing Jay
Amaya from Atlantika
Amazing Ving
Amazona, ally of Batang Z
Amihan of the Diwatas (Philippine god of wind; Marvel Comics' Thor & Hercules: Encyclopædia Mythologica)
Amihan from Encantadia and Etheria
Amulette from Flashpoint
Angel from Biotrog
Angel Ace
Angstrom from Flashpoint
Anino from Sandugo
Anitun from Triumph Division and the Diwatas (Philippine goddess of wind, lightning, and rain; Marvel Comics' Thor & Hercules: Encyclopædia Mythologica)
Anti-Bobo Man
Apache
Apo Laki of the Diwatas (Philippine god of day and war; Marvel Comics' Thor & Hercules: Encyclopædia Mythologica)
Arya
Aster
Aquano from Atlantika
Aquil from Encantadia
Astig from Batch 72
Ato
Atom Man
Atong son of Ato
Ava Abanico from Super Inggo
Amy from Zaido
Andre Lupin
Asero (Grecko Abesamis) from Codename: Asero
Asero a.k.a. Hector Zuniga
Aya / Diwani Olivia from Enchanted Garden

B
Babaeng Isputnik
Babaing Kidlat
Mr. Badassman
Bagwis
Bagwis from Bayan Knights
Bakal Boy
Balzaur 
Batang X
Batang Z
Batch 72
Bathala of the Diwatas (Philippine god of the sky; Marvel Comics' Thor & Hercules: Encyclopædia Mythologica)
Bato from Bayan Knights and Sandugo
Bayan Knights
Berdugo
Bernardo Karpio from Sandugo
Bianong Bulag
Billy The Dragon
Binibining Tsuper-man
BioKid (comic)
BioKids (movie)
Biotrog
Blade
Blue Turbo Max
Boga
Bolt 
Bokutox / Bok
Botak
Booster B from Bayan Knights
Boy Bawang
Boy Ipis from Bayan Knights
Boy Pinoy
Bronco
Brown-out from Batch 72
Bughaw (Tabak ni Bulalakaw)
Buhawi Jack
Bulalakaw

C
Calyptus (engkanto) from Panday
Camia – leader of the vukad (group of female warriors) from Panday
Captain Barangay Captain
Captain Barbell by Mars Ravelo
Captain Juliet Chavez from Flashpoint
Captain Flamingo
Captain Karate
Captain Philippines
Captain Suicide
Carlo from Fly Me to the Moon movie
Cassandra (Warrior Angel)
Cassandra from RPG Metanoia
Codename: Bathala from Bayan Knights
Captain Steel (Earth-2) (Hank Heywood Jr.) from DC Comics
Computer Man
Cardo Dalisay from Ang Probinsyano
Carmela from Zaido 
Chan Lee
Charlie from Panday Kids
Claw
Combatron from Pilipino FUNNY Komiks is a space warrior and protector of Earth.
Crisval Sarmiento from Resiklo
Cruzado
Combat
Control from Batang X
Copycat
Cuatro y medya
Cyfer from Kalayaan

D
Dahlia from Panday
Dalmatio Armas from Carlo Caparas Newspaper Serial
Danaya from Encantadia and Etheria
Darna by Mars Ravelo
Darna Kuno
Dark Knight
Darmo Adarna
Datu, leader of Pintados
Datu Pag-Asa from Sandugo
Deathstorm
Dennis from My Super D
Davanta from Bayan Knights
Dinky and the Wonder Dragon
Diwata from Pintados
Diwata from Sandugo
Doc Kuwago from Batang X
Dodong a.k.a. Super D from My Super D
Don El Oro
Dragonna by Mars Ravelo
Dwarfina
Dyesebel by Mars Ravelo
Dyosa

E
El Indio
Elias Paniki by Carlo J. Caparas
Elektro from Puwersa ng Kalikasan
Enteng-Anting
Enteng Kabisote from Okay Ka, Fairy Ko! and Enteng Kabisote movies
Exodus, a mercenary from Exodus: Tales from the Enchanted Kingdom
Extranghero
Eman from "Kuwtmak"

F
Fantasia from Krystala
Fantastic Man
Fantastica (old Filipino movie heroine)
Fantastikids
Fighter One from Triumph Division
Filipino Heroes League
Flash Bomba by Mars Ravelo
Flashlight
Flashpoint
Flavio, the original Panday
Flavio, descendant and namesake of the original Flavio

G
G:Boy from Batang X
Gabriel Black from Bayan Knights
Gabriel Labrador from Agimat ng Agila
Gabriella from FlashpointGagamba
Gagambino (or Bino)
Gagamboy
Galema, anak ni Zuma
Gandarra from Gandarrapiddo: The Revenger SquadGante from Bayan KnightsGeneral Star 
Grail (WildStorm) of Wetworks. Symbiote and "chi" energy / EM control.
Great Mongoose from Triumph DivisionGuiller, replaced the original Panday in Hiwaga ng PandayGwapoman from Bayan KnightsH
Hadji from Panday KidsHagibis – similar to Tarzan. Created by Francisco V. Coching and one of the first Filipino superheroes
Haribon
Hammerman from Victor MagtanggolHandog from Bayan KnightsHee-Man
Hiro
Hugo
Hunyago, protagonist of a 1992 Filipino film
Hamza from "Kuwtmak"

I
Ida from Bayan KnightsIncrediBelle
Invisiboy (Filipino Heroes League)
Ipo-ipo – presumably the first costumed superhero in the Philippines created by Lib Abrena, graphics by Os del Rosario.
Ispikikay

J
Japanese Bat
Jasmina, Reyna from Enchanted GardenJessa (of Blusang Itim) from Super InggoJoaquin Bordado
Jolas Zuares
Juan dela Cruz from the television series of the same name.
Juan Tanga
Julio Valiente
Junior from Bayan KnightsJuro from Ang Panday (2016 TV series) Flavio's descendant from the modern time, and the third to take up the mantle of Panday
Jawhaina from "Kuwtmak"

K
Kabalyero from Bayan KnightsKabayo Kids
Kadasig from Bayan KnightsKadi from Batch 72Kahddim
Kahimu from PandayKalasag from Bayan KnightsKalayaan from GMP Comics
Kamandag by Carlo J. Caparas
Kamagong 
Kamagong from Enchanted GardenKampeon (Jimmy Rey, appeared in Kidlat Super Heroes Komiks)
Kampeon (Super Adventure Komix)
Kampyon
Kapitan Aksiyon
Kapitan Awesome
Kapitan Bandila from Bayan KnightsKaptain Barbell
Kapitan Boom
Kapitan Kidlat 
Kapitan Kidlat (Leonardo Abutin's character)
Kapitan Inggo
Kapitan Pagong
Kapitan Sino
Karatecha 
Kaupay from PandayKawal from Bayan KnightsKidLat from Batang XKidlat from TV5's Kidlat 2013 TV series.
Kidlat (Obet Santos) from Kung Tawagin Siya'y KidlatKidlat from PintadosKidlat Kid (Filipino Heroes League)
Kick Fighters
Kickero
Kilabot from Bayan KnightsKisig Pinoy
K'Mao from RPG MetanoiaKnight Hawk (Bolt Gadin)
Knighthawk 
Kumander Bawang
Kupcake from Batch 72Kuryente Kid
Krystala
Kulafu by Francisco Reyes and Pedrito Reyes, presumably the first Filipino superhero
Kulog from Kung Tawagin Siya'y KidlatKung Fu Chinito
Kung Fu Kids

L
Lady Mantisa, aka Lucy, from GagambinoLady Untouchable (old Filipino movie heroine)
Lagim
Lam-Ang from SandugoLapu-Lapu
Laser Man by D.G. Salonga (writer) and Abel Laxamana (artist)
Lastikman by Mars Ravelo
LastikDog
Lawin from Ang Alamat ng LawinLeah or Super Bee from GagambinoLeather from Bayan KnightsLeon Artemis from Bayan KnightsLeon Guerrero
Liberty Girl from Bayan KnightsLieutenant J
Lilit Bulilit (Funny Komiks 1984)
Lira, daughter of Amihan and Ybarro from EncantadiaLito from Bayan KnightsLualhati from KrystalaLucia from DyesebelLuzviminda from Bayan KnightsLyn Tek from Bayan KnightsM
Machete
Magnum from Bayan KnightsMananabas from Bayan KnightsMang Kepweng (Comics)
Manila Man from Bayan KnightsMarella (Earth-2) from DC Comics
Maria Constantino (Filipino Heroes League)
Maskarado from Bayan KnightsMaso from Bayan KnightsMaster Cleu from EncantadiaMatanglawin from Bayan KnightsMerza, lady mercenary from Ninja Komiks by Bobby V. Villagracia and Boy Baarde
Midknight
Mine-a (the Ynang Reyna), mother of the four Sang'gres from Encantadia and EtheriaMiguel (Ang Panday 2016 TV Series) Flavio's descendant. The second to take up the mantle of Panday
Miguel, the protagonist from SugoMokong from KrystalaMolave from Enchanted GardenMr. Atlas
Mysterio from KrystalaMira, daughter of Pirena from EncantadiaMarina
Mayari of the Diwatas (Philippine goddess of the moon and night; Marvel Comics' Thor & Hercules: Encyclopædia Mythologica)
Mayumi from PintadosMighty M from KrystalaMighty Mother from Triumph DivisionMighty Ken from Super InggoMighty T
Mithi from Bayan KnightsMr. Pol (Leopoldo Guerrero) from Tatak ng KatarunganMorion from Bayan KnightsMajeed from "Kuwtmak"

N
Narra from Sandugo and Bayan KnightsNieves, an engkanto slayer from Shake, Rattle & Roll XNiño from Bayan KnightsNgid also Darno in other Darna reincarnation (Super Action Vol. 2 #12 1999)
Niño Valiente 
Noah from Bayan KnightsO
Olen
Onslaught from FlashpointOro from FlashpointOverdrive from Bayan KnightsP
P.I. Joey 
Pag-Asa from Bayan KnightsPalos by Nestor Redondo and Virgilio Redondo
Pasa Hero
Pastor Banal from Bayan KnightsPatintina from Laban ng LahiPayaso from FlashpointPammy from Batch 72Panday Kids
Pandoy, the Panday's apprentice
Pao from Ang Agimat: Anting Anting ni LoloPassion from FlashpointPedro Penduko by Francisco V. Coching
Pepeng Agimat
Perseus the Starlord
Petrang Kabayo
Phantom Cat from Bayan KnightsPhantom Lady
Pinoy Rangers (Batang X Komiks 1995)
Pintados
Pintura from Bayan KnightsPirena from Encantadia and EtheriaPromiteyo
Pusang Itim
Puwersa ng Kalikasan

Q
Quassia, Diwani from Enchanted GardenQuattro from Bayan KnightsR
Raja Team One from BathalaRandie from Batch 72Rapiddo from Gandarrapiddo: The Revenger SquadRaquim from Encantadia and Etheria, is a prince of Sapiro and the father of Amihan.
Red Feather from Triumph DivisionRed Ninja from Biotrog
Reserve Agent King Agila a.k.a. Agent X44 from Agent X44Rocco, ang batang bato
Royal Blue
Rubberman
Ryan from "Kuwtmak" 
Rayan from "Kuwtmak"

S
Sabina from MajikaSalakay of Bayan KnightsSandata from SandugoSandugo, a superhero team
Santelma from Bayan KnightsSarhento Sagrado of Bayan KnightsScorpio from Sapot ni Gagamba - Kasama si Scorpio
Sentensyador
Servant from Bayan KnightsShe-Man
Sidapa from SandugoSilaw from Bayan KnightsSinag from Bayan KnightsSiopawman by Larry Alcala, may be the first, albeit fumbling, Pinoy komiks superhero
Sipatos from Laban ng LahiSlick (Filipino Heroes League)
Snake Force (Cobra, Python, Rattlesnake and Dahong Palay)
St. George from Triumph DivisionStarfighters 
Starra
Sumpak from RPG MetanoiaSuper-B (Bilma)
Super Bing
Super Delta from My Super DSuper Idol
Super Inday
Super Inggo
Super Islaw
Super Gee
Super Kikay (a.k.a. Super K)
Super Lolo
Super Ma'am
Super Noypi
Super Ranger Kids (1997 Film)
Super Talipa, character of a Santo Tomas, Batangas Cable Show
Super Twins
Super Wan*Tu*Tri
Super Vhing
Supercat
Superdog
Supergirl
Superkat
Supremo from SandugoSarah from "Kuwtmak"

T
Tala of the Diwatas (Philippine goddess of the stars; Marvel Comics' Thor & Hercules: Encyclopædia Mythologica)
Talahib, a Kulafu-like character by Francisco Reyes
Talim from Bayan KnightsTara Tarantula: The Spider Lady
Tatto from PintadosTaurus
Tayho, a tikbalang and earth elemental/engkanto from Exodus: Tales from the Enchanted KingdomTeg from Super InggoThe Evil Buster
The Maker (Filipino Heroes League)
Three-Na (3-Na) from Batang XTinay Pinay
Tiny Tony by Mars Ravelo
Tinyente Tagalog
Tiagong Akyat
Tobor
Tol from Batch 72Tonyong Bayawak
Totoy Bato
Tough Hero a.k.a. Brix
Transformer Man
Triumph Division from Marvel Comics by Matt Fraction and Salvador Larroca
Tsuperhero (Noynoy), a jeepney driver and berserker in GMA Network's TsuperheroTsuperman
Turbo Girl

U
Urban Rangers – framed cops turned vigilante superheroes with advance equipment
Unstoppable from Bayan KnightsV
Valeriana, Diwani (Good Valeriana) from Enchanted GardenVarga by Mars Ravelo
Volta (see also Volta (TV series))

W
Wang from Batch 72Wapakman
Wave (Pearl Pangan) from Marvel Comics' The New Agents of Atlas by Greg Pak (writer) and Leinil Francis Yu (artist)
Widad the Loving (Hope Mendoza) of the 99
Wishing Man from Triumph DivisionWonder Dabiana
Wonder Vi

X
X-Gen (Dr. Javier, Cyclon, Steel, Alamid, Raja, Psi-Lock, Hamok, Seraph)
X-Man

Y
Ybarro/Ybrahim from Encantadia and Etheria is the king of Sapiro and heir to the Kalasag.
Yasmin from "Kuwtmak"
Yousra from "Kuwtmak"

Z
Zsazsa Zaturnnah
Zaido: the Space Sherriffs from Metal Hero SeriesZaido Blue
Zaido Green
Zaido Red
Zaido Kids
Zarda (old TV series heroine)
Zero from RPG MetanoiaZheamay from Bayan Knights''
Zigomar
Zoids 
Zuma, while he is the antagonist in earlier comic book, he is the protagonist in the later serial

See also 

 Philippine comics
 List of Filipino komik artists
 List of Filipino comics creators
 List of Filipino komiks
 List of Filipino supervillains

References

External links
 "Philippine Comics" The most comprehensive library of Filipino comics on the internet.
 Pinoy Superheroes Universe "An online compendium of Filipino comic book heroes from the 80'S, 90'S and beyond."
 International Catalogue of Superheroes

 
 
Filipino
Filipino